Sahibzada Faiz Ul Hassan (born 1 January 1952) is a Pakistani politician who was a member of the National Assembly of Pakistan from June 2013 to May 2018.

Political career

Faiz Ul Hassan ran for a seat in the National Assembly of Pakistan as a candidate of the Pakistan Muslim League (N) (PML-N) from the Constituency NA-181 (Layyah-I) in the 2002 Pakistani general election but was unsuccessful. He received 56,490 votes and lost the seat to Sardar Bahadur Ahmed Khan.

He ran for the seat of the National Assembly  as a candidate of PML-N from Constituency NA-181 (Layyah-I) in 2008 Pakistani general election but was unsuccessful. He received 56,951 votes and lost the seat to Sardar Bahadur Ahmed Khan.

He was elected to the National Assembly as a candidate of PML-N from Constituency NA-181 (Layyah-I) in the 2013 Pakistani general election. He received 119,403 votes and defeated Sardar Bahadur Ahmed Khan.

He ran for the seat of the National Assembly as a candidate of PML-N from NA-187 (Layyah-I) but was unsuccessful. He received 64,582 votes and lost the seat to Abdul Majeed Khan.

References

Living people
Pakistan Muslim League (N) politicians
Punjabi people
Pakistani MNAs 2013–2018
1952 births